The Maringarr language (Marri Ngarr, Marenggar, Maringa) is a moribund Australian Aboriginal language spoken along the northwest coast of the Northern Territory.

Marti Ke (Magati Ke, Matige, Magadige, Mati Ke, also  Magati-ge, Magati Gair) lies in the same language category. It is or was spoken by the Mati Ke people.  it is included in a language revival project which aims to preserve critically endangered languages.

Geographic distribution
The language has been spoken in the Northern Territory, Wadeye, along Timor Sea, coast south from Moyle River estuary to Port Keats, southwest of Darwin.

Current status

According to the Language Database, as of 2005 Mati Ke language had a population of three (Patrick Nudjulu, Johnny Chula, Agatha Perdjert). Mati Ke speakers have primarily switched to use of English and the flourishing Aboriginal language Murrinh-Patha. The ethnic population is about 100, and there are 50 second language users.

As the language is almost non-existent to date, linguists have been working on collecting information and recording the voices of the remaining speakers.

Language revival project
, Mati Ke is one of 20 languages prioritised as part of the Priority Languages Support Project, being undertaken by First Languages Australia and funded by the Department of Communications and the Arts. The project aims to "identify and document critically-endangered languages — those languages for which little or no documentation exists, where no recordings have previously been made, but where there are living speakers".

Grammar 
The vocabulary is limited, therefore the relations and positioning of the words matter to make sense of the construction according to the situation. It is a polysynthetic language. 

Marringarr also contains ergativity, which is marked by the postposition -ŋarrin. 

Nouns' classification constitutes a core of the language that forms an understanding of the world for its speakers. There are 10 noun classes including: trees, wooden items and long rigid objects; manufactured and natural objects; vegetables; weapons and lightning; places and times; animals; higher beings such as spirits and people, and speech and languages.

Selected Vocabulary

References

External links
 Marri Ngarr at the Dalylanguages.org website.

Western Daly languages
Endangered indigenous Australian languages in the Northern Territory